Liu Jingji (September 15, 1902 – February 15, 1997) was a Chinese male politician, who served as the vice chairperson of the Chinese People's Political Consultative Conference.

References 

1902 births
1997 deaths
Vice Chairpersons of the National Committee of the Chinese People's Political Consultative Conference